Fogg may refer to:

 Fogg (surname), including a list of people with the name
 Fogg Art Museum, at Harvard University
 Fogg Dam in Humpty Doo, Northern Territory, Australia
 Hume-Fogg High School, in Nashville, Tennessee, United States
 Liqueur Fogg, a Brazilian liqueur 
 USS Fogg (DE-57), a United States Navy destroyer escort

See also

 
 Fogge (disambiguation)
 Fog (disambiguation)